Leesburg is a city in Lake County, Florida, United States. The population was 20,117 at the 2010 census. As of 2019, the population recorded by the U.S. Census Bureau was 23,671.

Leesburg is in central Florida, between Lake Harris and Lake Griffin, at the head of the Ocklawaha River. It is part of the Orlando–Kissimmee–Sanford Metropolitan Statistical Area.

Lake–Sumter State College and Beacon College are located in Leesburg.

History

Leesburg was first settled in 1857 by Evander McIver Lee. Several of his brothers followed him to the area. One of them, Calvin Lee, was credited with giving the town its name. The city was incorporated in 1875, and was designated as the county seat of Sumter County for a time. When Lake County was formed in 1887, Tavares was designated as its seat.

In the early 20th century, Leesburg was an important center for watermelon production. In 1930, it held its first Watermelon Festival, an annual tradition that lasted for nearly 30 years. But gradually watermelon production dwindled and, for the last festival in 1957, watermelons had to be brought to the city from outside the area.

In 1938, during the Great Depression, the Franklin D. Roosevelt administration invested in infrastructure and improvement projects across the county. Its Works Progress Administration began work on the Venetian Gardens waterside park, located on the shores of Lake Harris. These canals and gardens have been a centerpiece of the community ever since.

Lake Square Mall, the city's major shopping mall, opened in 1980.

On March 19, 1982, Ozzy Osbourne's guitarist Randy Rhoads, as well as the band's cook and bus driver, were killed in a plane crash at Flying Baron Estates.

The citrus industry was the principal business in this area for decades, but devastating freezes in December 1983 and February 1985 persuaded growers to move their groves further south. In 1997, Leesburg Bikefest started. It has since become an annual spring tradition, with upwards of 250,000 people attending every year.

Today, most of Leesburg's growth and economic development is the result of its increasing popularity as a retirement destination. In addition, the rapid growth of nearby Orlando has resulted in demand for housing here, as many people commute to Orlando for work. In 2011 and 2017, the Leesburg High School boys' basketball team won the 4A state championship.

In spring 2017, the Holding Company of the Villages planned to acquire 2,600 acres north and south of County Road 470 along the east side of Florida’s Turnpike for future development. The deal with the mega-retirement community has passed due diligence by the Leesburg City Commission. Age-restricted zoning ordinance changes have already been approved by the Leesburg Planning Commission (with the city commission giving final approval). The initial plans call for building approximately 4,500 homes and some commercial development.

Geography

Leesburg is located 44.5 miles NNW of Orlando, 270 miles N of Miami, and 221 miles SW of Tallahassee, the state capital.

Several major highways pass through Leesburg, including U.S. Highway 27, U.S. Highway 441 and S.R. 44. Florida's Turnpike passes just to the south and west of Leesburg. Leesburg was on the western leg of the Dixie Highway.

Climate

Demographics

As of the census of 2000, there were 15,956 people, 6,775 households, and 4,078 families residing in the city. The racial makeup of the city was 66.60% White, 29.12% African American, 0.27% Native American, 1.33% Asian, 0.01% Pacific Islander, 1.26% from other races, and 1.41% from two or more races. Hispanic or Latino of any race were 4.12% of the population.

As of the 2020 Census, There were exactly 27,000 people in Leesburg. Of these people, 68.3% were Caucasian, 26.8% were African-American, 0.2% Native American, 1.9% Asian, less than 0.05% Pacific Islander, 2.2% that are two or more races, and 18.3% Hispanic. The median income per household is $37,092 as of 2019.

There were 6,775 households, out of which 24.5% had children under the age of 18 living with them, 39.6% were married couples living together, 16.8% had a female householder with no husband present, and 39.8% were non-families. 33.9% of all households were made up of individuals, and 18.1% had someone living alone who was 65 years of age or older. The average household size was 2.26 and the average family size was 2.86.

In the city, the population was spread out, with 23.5% under the age of 18, 7.8% from 18 to 24, 22.7% from 25 to 44, 19.7% from 45 to 64, and 26.2% who were 65 years of age or older. The median age was 42 years. For every 100 females, there were 83.8 males. For every 100 females age 18 and over, there were 78.2 males.

The median income for a household in the city was $25,988, and the median income for a family was $33,250. Males had a median income of $25,840 versus $20,888 for females. The per capita income for the city was $15,762. About 16.2% of families and 19.8% of the population were below the poverty line, including 35.3% of those under age 18 and 11.9% of those age 65 or over.

Arts and Culture 
The Leesburg Public Library was founded in 1875. The library moved to the Venetian Gardens in 1953 when Leesburg established a library charter, and in 2007, it moved to a  building. The library joined the Lake County Library System in 2002.

The Leesburg Center for the Arts is a nonprofit founded in 2000, to provide art education and exhibitions.

The Leesburg African American Museum contains African American artifacts.

The Melon Patch Players is a nonprofit theater group founded in 1951.

Sports

Baseball
From 1922 to 1924, the city's Cooke Field was used by the Philadelphia Phillies for their spring training sessions. On March 14, 1923, the stadium was used for the site of an exhibition game between the Phillies and the St. Louis Cardinals. In 1936, the city built the Ballpark at Venetian Gardens, which was used by several minor league baseball clubs that played in the Florida State League from 1937 to 1968. The city won league titles in 1941 and 1946. Since 2007, the city has been the home of the Leesburg Lightning, a wood-bat collegiate summer baseball team in the Florida Collegiate Summer League.

Shooting exhibitions
During the 1920s, sharpshooter Annie Oakley, who had a residence in Leesburg, performed shooting exhibitions at Cooke Field, including one for the Philadelphia Phillies.

Education

Public schools
Lake County Schools operates public primary and secondary schools:
 Leesburg High School
 Carver Middle School
Oak Park Middle School
 Leesburg Elementary School
Beverly Shores Elementary School
Tredway Elementary School
Rimes Early Learning and Literacy Center

Private schools
 First Academy-Leesburg
 Saint Paul Catholic School-Leesburg

Colleges
Beacon College
Lake–Sumter State College

Infrastructure
Leesburg International Airport is a small hub airport at the intersection of CR 44 and US 441, in front of Lake-Sumter State College. It is a hub of JetSky airlines, and serves Lake, Sumter, and Marion Counties.

Notable people
 Abe Anellis, a food microbiologist born in Mahilyow, Belarus, retired to Leesburg in 1977
 Vince Fechtel Jr., politician
 Susan Harrison, actress
 Virgil D. Hawkins. African American attorney and Civil Rights activist
 Syd Herlong, politician
 Jonathan Hay, music producer, publicist
 Dan Hinote, St. Louis Blues center was born in Leesburg
 Bill McBride, former candidate for Florida governor, husband of former Florida CFO Alex Sink, grew up in Leesburg
 David McCheyne Newell, author, journalist
 Ginger Minj, AKA Joshua Eads, drag queen, three-time contestant on RuPaul's Drag Race
 George Stephen Morrison grew up in Leesburg and was the father of Jim Morrison of The Doors
 Austin "Red" Robbins, ABA player, was born in Leesburg
 Brady Singer Professional Baseball Pitcher for the Kansas City Royals
 Robert S Singleton, American engineer and scientist, graduated from Leesburg High School
 Johnny Thunder, singer
 Lillian Vickers-Smith, first female newspaper sports editor and writer for the Leesburg Commercial

References

External links

 

 
Cities in Lake County, Florida
Greater Orlando
Cities in Florida
Former county seats in Florida
Populated places established in 1857
1857 establishments in Florida